Curiosa la cara de tu padre (in English: It Was Curious Your Father's Face) is the fourth studio album by Asturian pop singer Melendi, produced by José de Castro. It was released September 16, 2008, and its first single was "Un violinista en tu tejado"

Credits 
 Eva Durán, Loli Abadía, José Losada, Josete & La Dama: backup singers. 
 Enzo Filippone, Manu Rey & Angie Bao: drums.
 Luis Dulzaides & Ramón "The Lion" González: percussion.
 José de Castro: electric and acoustic guitar.
 José Luis Ordóñez and José Losada: Spanish guitar.
 José Vera: bass.

Track listing 
 Como una vela
 Un violinista en tu tejado
 Un tipo diferente
 Piratas del bar Caribe
 Déjame vivir
 Mis alas son tus hojas
 Maldita vida loca
 En ocasiones veo muertos (Remix of the original song, written in 2003, and played live)
 Qué más puede salir mal
 Las cosas del amor
 Curiosa la cara de tu padre
 Los premios Pinocho
 La mi mozuca (hidden track)
 Historia de dos
 Vampiresa

References 

Melendi albums
2003 albums